Wüster is a German language habitational surname. Notable people with the name include:

 Eugen Wüster (1898–1977), Austrian scientist
 Wolfgang Wüster (1964), British zoologist

References 

German-language surnames
German toponymic surnames